IETA may refer to:

 County Tipperary, county in Ireland (ISO 3166-2 code IE-TA)
 Ingénieur des études et techniques de l'armement, military occupational branch of the French military
 International Emissions Trading Association, international association for the establishment of trading in greenhouse gas emissions by businesses